Franchesca "Chesca" Abanador Salcedo, also known as Chesca Salcedo (born March 16, 2002) is a Filipina actress. She plays the role of Cruzita Aldama Santibañez in MariMar, the legitimate daughter of Marimar Aldama and Sergio Santibañez. Although her nickname in real life is Cruzita, her acting roles in both MariMar and Claudine had her playing a character named Cruzita, which she was given after her stint on the former.

Early life and career
Prior to acting in MariMar, Franchesca auditioned for the main role in Maria Flordeluna and was accepted. However, during the pre-photoshoot for Maria Flordeluna she was told on the spot that she was replaced by Eliza Pineda, her current co-star in Kambal, Karibal. Franchesca is currently attending home study program as a student in Angelicum College.

Franchesca portrayed the role of Cruzita Aldama Santibañez in MariMar that make her debut in big screen and made her first TV appearances. She then went back to big screen after a years in 2010 to portray the role of Marva in Panday Kids. Francheska mailed to Wish Ko Lang for his brother who has mental illness she only wants treatment for his brothers illness. In 2010, Francheska Salcedo played the role of Sugar Ferrer in the new installment of Sine Novela: Trudis Liit as a young villain of Trudis.
She also take part of the movie titled "Dota o ako the movie".

In 2017, Franchesca Salcedo joins the cast of GMA Network hit primetime drama series Kambal, Karibal where she portrayed the role of Nori, a goth, good best friend of Crisan (played by Bianca Umali).

Filmography

Television

Film

References

External links

2002 births
Living people
Actresses from Laguna (province)
Filipino child actresses
Filipino Roman Catholics
Filipino television actresses
People from San Pablo, Laguna
GMA Network personalities
TV5 (Philippine TV network) personalities